The 2021 Southern Jaguars football team represented Southern University in the 2021 NCAA Division I FCS football season. The Jaguars played their home games at Ace W. Mumford Stadium in Baton Rouge, Louisiana, and competed in the West Division of the Southwestern Athletic Conference (SWAC). They were led by interim head coach Jason Rollins.

Schedule

Game summaries

at Troy

Miles

McNeese State

vs. Mississippi Valley State

vs. Texas Southern

at Arkansas–Pine Bluff

Prairie View A&M

Alcorn State

Florida A&M

No. 18 Jackson State

vs. Grambling State

References

Southern
Southern Jaguars football seasons
Southern Jaguars football